Ocean 2: The Answer is the sixteenth studio album by German rock band Eloy, released in 1998. It was the conceptual and, some would say, musical follow-up to the band's 1977 album Ocean.

This album saw the addition to the band of drummer Bodo Schopf.

The keyboard outro to "Reflections from the Spheres Beyond" is very reminiscent of the main theme to the 1970s American sci-fi TV series, "Battlestar Galactica."

Track listing
Lyrics by Frank Bornemann. Music as indicated.
 "Between Future and Past" (Michael Gerlach)  – 2:43
 "Ro Setau" (Bornemann)  – 7:09
 "Paralysed Civilization" (Bornemann/Gerlach)  – 9:28
 "Serenity" (Bornemann/Gerlach/Klaus-Peter Matziol)  – 3:09
 "Awakening of Consciousness" (Bornemann/Gerlach)  – 6:03
 "Reflections from the Spheres Beyond" (Bornemann/Gerlach)  – 12:59
 "Waves of Intuition" (Bornemann/Matziol)  – 4:56
 "The Answer" (Bornemann)  – 11:19

Personnel
Frank Bornemann — vocals, guitar
Michael Gerlach — keyboards, backing vocals
Klaus-Peter Matziol — bass
Bodo Schopf — drums & percussion
Produced by Frank Bornemann

Guest musicians
Steve Mann — slide guitar on "The Answer"
Susanne Schätzle — backing vocals
Tina Lux — backing vocals
Hannes Folberth — MiniMoog on "Ro Setau"
Volker Kuinke — recorder (flute) on "Paralysed Civilization", "Waves of Intuition", and "The Answer"
Peter Beckett and Tom Jackson — choir on "The Answer"
Daniela Wöhler, Frederike Stübner and Susanne Moldenhauer — soprano voices on "The Answer"
Prague Philharmonic Choir on "The Answer"

1998 albums
Eloy (band) albums
GUN Records albums